Jan Boleslav Sedivka  (in Czech: Šedivka) (Slaný, 8 September 1917 Hobart, 23 August 2009), Czech-born, was one of Australia's foremost violinists and teachers.

Biography
Educated in Czechoslovakia (Otakar Ševčík and Jaroslav Kocián), France (École Normale de Musique, Classe Jacques Thibaud) and England (Max Rostal), Jan Sedivka made his reputation overseas as a soloist, chamber music player and teacher before coming to Australia in 1961.

As a performer, Jan Sedivka gained special merit for his efforts on behalf of Australian contemporary music. In this capacity he introduced a number of important works dedicated to him, in particular concertos by Larry Sitsky (Nos. 1, 2, 3 & 4), James Penberthy, Ian Cugley, Don Kay, Colin Brumby, Edward Cowie and Eric Gross.

His wife Beryl Sedivka is a noted pianist who often performed with him.

Writings
 An Assessment of: “Bach’s Chaconne for Unaccompanied Violin - a Study in Interpretation” by Graham Wood, ds., Hobart, 1974

Honours and awards
 Member of the Order of Australia 1987
 Honorary Fellow, Trinity College of Music, London
 Honorary Doctor of Letters, University of Tasmania
 Honorary Professor, Shanghai Conservatory of Music
 Memorial Gold Medal, Prague Academy of Musical Arts
 Honorary Fellowship in Music Australia
 Honorary Citizen, Royal City of Slany (Czech Republic)
 Honorary Professor University of Tasmania 1995
 Distinguished Service Award Australian Strings Association 1998.

Bernard Heinze Memorial Award
The Sir Bernard Heinze Memorial Award is given to a person who has made an outstanding contribution to music in Australia.

! 
|-
| 1995 || Jan Sedivka || Sir Bernard Heinze Memorial Award ||  || 
|-

Don Banks Music Award
The Don Banks Music Award was established in 1984 to publicly honour a senior artist of high distinction who has made an outstanding and sustained contribution to music in Australia. It was founded by the Australia Council in honour of Don Banks, Australian composer, performer and the first chair of its music board.

|-
| 2004
| Jan Sedivka
| Don Banks Music Award
| 
|-

Students

Bibliography

 Philippe Borer, Aspects of European Influences on Violin Playing & Teaching in Australia, M.Mus. diss., 1988 (on Jan Sedivka's violin playing and teaching philosophies see Chapters III and IV) https://eprints.utas.edu.au/18865/
 Lyndal Edmiston, “The teacher as catalyst in the learning process”, in Festschrift Jan Sedivka, ed. by D. S. Mercer, Hobart, The Tasmanian Conservatorium of Music, 1982
 Jan Mařàk–Viktor Nopp, Housle, Prague, Hudební matice Umělecké besedy, 1944, p. 61 
 Elisabeth Morgan, “String Teaching: an extended perspective”, in Festschrift Jan Sedivka, ed. by D. S. Mercer, Hobart, The Tasmanian Conservatorium of Music, 1982, pp. 100–109
 Elinor Morrisby, Up is down, a life of violinist Jan Sedivka, Melbourne, 2008
 Marina Louise Phillips, An assessment of the contribution to Australian string pedagogy and performance of Jan Sedivka, PhD diss., 2001

References

1917 births
2009 deaths
Australian classical violinists
Male classical violinists
Members of the Order of Australia
Czechoslovak emigrants to Australia
20th-century classical violinists
20th-century Australian musicians
20th-century Australian male musicians